The discography of Linda Ronstadt, an American rock, pop and country artist (who also recorded in other genres, such as light opera and traditional Mexican music), consists of 24 solo studio albums, one live album, numerous compilation albums, and 63 singles. Widely recognized as the reigning "Queen of Rock", Ronstadt is estimated with 100 million record sales worldwide. According to Recording Industry Association of America (RIAA), she has sold 30 million certified albums in the United States, making her the ninth best-selling female solo artist in the country. Billboard ranked her as the 67th greatest artist of all time.

After recording three albums with her folk rock band, The Stone Poneys, Ronstadt debuted on Capitol Records as a solo artist with 1969's Hand Sown ... Home Grown. Her final album was released in 2006. Between 1970 and 1973, Ronstadt released three studio albums: two on the Capitol label, Silk Purse (1970) and Linda Ronstadt (1971); and one on the Asylum label, Don't Cry Now (1973). Developing a country rock sound similar to that of the Eagles, Ronstadt recorded 1974's Grammy-winning Heart Like a Wheel, which sold over two million U. S. copies and spawned the #1 hits "When Will I Be Loved" and "You're No Good". Her next album was 1975's Prisoner in Disguise, which followed a similar musical style and contained a top five cover of "Heat Wave". Released in 1976, Hasten Down the Wind featured two Ronstadt-composed originals and established Ronstadt as the first ever female recording artist to release three million-selling albums. Its biggest hits were a cover of Buddy Holly's "That'll Be The Day" and a reworking of Willie Nelson's "Crazy". The album won Ronstadt her second Grammy Award. 
  
Her 1977 release, Simple Dreams, followed a more rock-oriented format. It went triple platinum in the United States and produced two simultaneous top five hits: the platinum-certified "Blue Bayou" and "It's So Easy". Additional hits from the album included "Poor Poor Pitiful Me", "Tumbling Dice", and the Top 10 country hit "I Never Will Marry". The following album, Living in the USA included a cover of Chuck Berry's "Back in the U.S.A.". It also contained a cover of the Motown classic "Ooh Baby Baby" which crossed over to R&B radio. In addition to the conventional Asylum release that is listed below, special limited-edition releases were also made of this album in red vinyl and picture disc. "Just One Look" was the album's third hit single.

Ronstadt's first disc of the 1980s was the New Wave-styled Mad Love. It debuted at number 5 on the Billboard album chart and quickly became her seventh million-selling album in a row. It produced Top 10 singles with "How Do I Make You" and the scorching "Hurt So Bad".  "Get Closer", regarded as her final Rock album, followed in 1982.  Four music videos were filmed for this album, all were popular on the fledgling MTV cable channel.  On April 24, 1980, Ronstadt recorded a concert at Hollywood's Television Center Studios for HBO, to coincide with the release of Mad Love. 12 hand-picked performances by Ronstadt were later released in her only live album, Live in Hollywood on February 1, 2019. In 1983, Ronstadt changed musical directions towards big band jazz and traditional pop music, recording What's New, which was certified Triple Platinum in the United States. It was succeeded by 1984's Lush Life and 1986's For Sentimental Reasons (both Platinum-certified).

To celebrate her Mexican American heritage, Ronstadt recorded the Spanish-language album Canciones de Mi Padre in 1987, which sold more than two million copies in the U.S. and won Ronstadt another Grammy Award.  It stands as the best-selling non-English language record in U.S. music history. The same year, she also teamed with Emmylou Harris and Dolly Parton for the collaborative album Trio, which spawned four Top 10 country music hits, including the number 1 single, "To Know Him Is To Love Him". Her 1989 release, titled Cry Like a Rainstorm, Howl Like the Wind, was Ronstadt's first pop music album in seven years. It produced two Grammy Award-winning duets with Aaron Neville on the Billboard Hot 100: the Gold-certified number 2 hit "Don't Know Much" and the number 11 hit "All My Life". Both songs were long-running number 1 Adult Contemporary hits.

After releasing two less successful Spanish-language albums in the early 1990s, Ronstadt returned to more contemporary music with 1993's New Age-styled Winter Light. It was followed by Feels Like Home, a return to country rock. Her Grammy-winning album of children's lullabies was issued in 1996 and had strong sales. Her 1998 release, We Ran, featured more rock-oriented album material. In 1999, Ronstadt reunited with Harris and Parton for Trio II, which won Ronstadt her eleventh competitive Grammy Award and nineteenth Gold album. That year she also recorded a Southwestern-inspired release with Harris, Western Wall: The Tucson Sessions. Her 2004 release, Hummin' to Myself, was Ronstadt's fourth album of traditional jazz standards. In 2006, she made what turned out to be her final studio album – Adieu False Heart – mixing Cajun music with rock in a collaboration with Ann Savoy.

The lists that follow do not include the many singles and albums on which Ronstadt provided guest vocals, such as the 1986 Philip Glass album Songs from Liquid Days on which she performed tracks written by Suzanne Vega and Laurie Anderson. It also omits her singles and albums as lead singer of Stone Poneys, although a number of recordings from that era have been included on her compilation albums.

Studio albums

1960s and 1970s

1980s

1990s and 2000s

Holiday album

Live album

Collaborations

Compilation albums

Singles

1960s and 1970s 

Note: Singles from 1967 and 1968 are by the Stone Poneys.

1980s

1990s

Other singles

Collaborations

Guest singles

Charted B-sides

Music videos

Notes

A^ Linda Ronstadt entered the Japanese chart for the first time at the release of reissue in 1977.
B^ Those albums entered the Japanese chart for the first time when Warner Music Japan released the remastered CDs in 2010.
C^ Living in the U.S.A. also peaked at number 19 on the Canadian RPM Country Albums chart.
D^ "Get Closer" also peaked at number 34 on the Hot Mainstream Rock Tracks chart.
E^ "Don't Know Much" also peaked at number 3 on the Austrian Singles Chart.

References

discography
 01
Discographies of American artists
Country music discographies
Rock music discographies